Salahaddin Khalilov ( is an Azerbaijani Philosopher.

Scientific-pedagogical activity
He defended his PhD (Kandidat nauk) thesis titled “Systematic Structural Analysis of Scientific and Technological Progress in the USSR” in 1976. After completing his postdoctoral research he defended a thesis titled “Logico-gnoseological issues of Scientific and Technological Progress” in 1989. In the same year he became a professor and the head of the Philosophy Department at Azerbaijan State Pedagogical University. He founded the University “Azerbaijan” — a private university in Azerbaijan in 1991 and was its rector up to 2006. Since 1994 he has been leading the Research Center “East and West”. Prof. S. Khalilov established the international socio-political journal “Ipek Yolu” (The Silk Road) in 1997 and was its Editor-in-Chief up to 2005. In 2002 he was elected as the Chairman of the Presidium of the Azerbaijan Association of Philosophy and Socio-Political Sciences (AFSEA). From 2003 he is the Editor-in-Chief of the Journal “Felsefe ve Sosial-siyasi Elmler” (Philosophy and Socio-Political Sciences). Since 2006 he is a Member of the Presidium of the Higher Attestation Commission under the President of the Republic of Azerbaijan. In 2007 Prof. Khalilov was elected as the Corresponding-Member of the Azerbaijan National Academy of Sciences. From 2009 he is the Chairman of Scientific Council of the National Academy of Sciences of Azerbaijan on Philosophy, Political and Social Sciences.

Prof. Khalilov’s investigations are mainly focused on Philosophy of Science, Philosophical Comparativism, Phenomenology, Philosophical Aspects of Eastern and Western Civilizations, Philosophy of Abu Turkhan, Cognitive Theory.

Social and educational activity
S.Khalilov founded and was the first leader of the Junior Physicists School in Azerbaijan in 1972.
He was elected as the Chairman of Young Scientists at Azerbaijan State Pedagogical University in 1981 and further in 1988 he was elected as the Chairman of Young Humanity Scientists of Azerbaijan. From 1997 he is the Chairman of Prize Committee named after Bahmaniar (award given for works on philosophy in Azerbaijan)

Prof. S.Khalilov was the Member of the Parliament of Azerbaijan and Deputy-Chairman of the “Science and Education” Permanent Commission of the Parliament during 2000-2005.

Selected publications
 Osnovaniya nauchno-technicheskogo progressa. Logiko-metodologicheskiy analiz. (Basics of scientific and technological progress. Logical and  methodological analysis) “Rossiskaya Ekologicheskaya Akademiya”, Ekonomika i informatika. Moskva 1997 (in Russian).()
 Peculiarities of Education in the East and West. XIIth Triennial Conference, Touchstones for a Modern University Culture, Brussels, 11–14 July 1999.
 East-West: science, education, religion.  «Azerbaycan Universiteti”, 2000
 The structure of knowledge: about a process of formation of the hierarchic. Proceedings of the Metaphysics for the Third Millennium Conference. September 5–8, 2000, Rome. Vol.2, pp. 89–93.  
 Problems of Education in the Post-Soviet Era. Alliance of Universities for Democracy. Perspectives in Higher Education Reform. Budapest, Volume 9, 2000, pp. 121–124.
 Civilization, Religion, and Terror. Proceedings of the  Alliance of Universities for Democracy.// Perspectives in Higher Education Reform. Volume 12, Bucharest,  November 2002, pp. 227–231.  
 The unity of diversity as the basic principle of the western model of social organization.  Proceedings of the Second world Conference: Metaphysics 2003. July 2–5, 2003, Rome. Vol.1, pp. 218–222.
 Sherg ve Gerb: umumbesheri ideala dogru. (East and West: to the universal ideal) Baki 2004 (in Azerbaijani).
 Tehsil, telim, terbiye. Baki 2005 (Education, training, attitude development) (in Azerbaijanian).
 ﺪﻮﻏﺮﻮ ﻻ ﺋﻴﺎ ﺍﻴﺪ ﺷﺭﻕ ﻭ ﻏﺮﺏ. ﻋﻮﻤﻭﻡ ﺑﺸﺭﻯ. Tehran, «Behreng», 2005.
 East and West as social models.  Global Studies Encyclopedia."Dialog Raduga Publishers", Moscow 2003, p. 116.and in Global Studies Encyclopedia. Prometheus Books, N-Y. 2005.
 Al-Suhrawardi’s Doctrine and Phenomenology. Islamic Philosophy and Occidental Phenomenology on the Perennial Issue of Microcosm and Macrocosm. Dordrecht, Springer, 2006, pp. 263–276. ( (HB);  (e-book))
 Peculiarities of Education in the East and West. Proceedings of the XXIst World Congress of Philosophy: August 10–17, 2003, Istanbul, Turkey. In Volume 4. Philosophy of Education. Ankara, 2006, pp. 73–77. ( (TK No); (4.C))
 Soul and Body in the Phenomenological Context. Phenomenology of Life – From the Animal Soul to the Human Mind Book II. The Human Soul in the Creative Transformation of the Mind. Series: Analecta Husserliana, Vol. 94 Tymieniecka, Anna-Teresa (Ed.), 2006, pp. 189–200. ( (HB);  (e-book))
 Felsefe: tarix ve muasirlik (felsefi komparativistika). (Philosophy: history and modernity) Baki 2006 (in Azerbaijani).
 Doğu-Batı: Ortak Bir Ideale Doğru. “Mefkure yayınları”, İstanbul, 2006. (in Turkish).
 Meneviyyat felsefesi. Baki 2007 (Philosophy of morality) (in Azerbaijani).
 Philosophy, science, culture. Their peculiarities in the East and the West. (Foreword by Prof.Anna-Teresa Tymieniecka). CA&CC Press©, Stockholm 2008. ( (hardback);  (paperback)).
       Doğu ́dan Batı ́ya Felsefe Körpüsü. “Ötüken”, İstanbul 2008. (in Turkish).
 Lyubov i intellekt.  (Love and intellect) Моskva, “Маsка”, 2009. (in Russian).
 Romanticheskaya poeziya v kontekste vostochno-zapadnoy problematiki. (Romantic poetry in the context of East-West problematique) Moskva. “Ves Mir”, 2009. (in Russian).
 Romantik şiirde Doğu-Batı meseleleri. “Ötüken”, İstanbul 2009. (in Turkish).
 About the correlation of the memory and remembrance in the structure of the soul. Analecta Husserliana. v. CI. // Memory in the ontopoiesis of life. Springer, 2009. pp. 243–252. ( (HB); e-)
 Sivilizasiyalarin dialoqu. (Dialogue of civilizations) Baki 2009 (in Azerbaijani).
 Elm adamlari elm haqqinda. (Scientists about science) Baki 2010 (in Azerbaijani).
 Elmshunasligin esaslari. (Basics of science about science) Baki 2010 (in Azerbaijani).
       Elm haqqında elm. (Science about Science) Bakı, 2011 (in Azerbaijani).
 Əbu Turxanın hikmət dünyası.(Abu Turkhan's World of Wisdom) Bakı, 2012 (in Azerbaijani).
 Книга афоризмов. Избранное из избранных. (Book of aphorisms. Favorites from favorites), Moskva: «Alfa-M», 2012 (in Russian).
 Phenomenology of Life or Life of Idea. Baku, “Azerbaijan University” Press, 2012.

References

External links
 
  alternate URL

Azerbaijani philosophers
Azerbaijani educators
1952 births
Living people
People from Marneuli
Georgian Azerbaijanis